This is a list of the National Register of Historic Places listings in Collingsworth County, Texas.

This is intended to be a complete list of properties and districts listed on the National Register of Historic Places in Collingsworth County, Texas. There are two properties listed on the National Register in the county.

Current listings

The locations of National Register properties may be seen in a mapping service provided.

|}

See also

National Register of Historic Places listings in Texas
Recorded Texas Historic Landmarks in Collingsworth County

References

External links

Collingsworth County, Texas
Collingsworth County
Buildings and structures in Collingsworth County, Texas